Jack Palmer (2 January 1905 – 5 October 1946) was an Australian rules footballer who played with St Kilda in the Victorian Football League (VFL).

Palmer was originally from South Australia, but spent a few years with St Kilda C.Y.M.S. before making his VFL debut in 1926

Notes

External links 

1905 births
1946 deaths
Australian rules footballers from South Australia
St Kilda Football Club players